The 2015–16 Ohio State Buckeyes women's basketball team will represent the Ohio State University during the 2015–16 NCAA Division I women's basketball season. The Buckeyes, led by third year head coach Kevin McGuff, play their home games at Value City Arena and were members of the Big Ten Conference. They finished the season 24–11, 15–3 in Big Ten play to finish in second place. They advanced to the semifinals of the Big Ten women's basketball tournament where they lost to Michigan State. They received at-large bid of the NCAA women's tournament where they defeated Buffalo and West Virginia in the first and second rounds round before losing to Tennessee in the sweet sixteen.

Roster

Schedule

|-
!colspan=9 style="background:#B31021; color:#999999;"| Exhibition

|-
!colspan=9 style="background:#B31021; color:#999999;"| Non-conference regular season

|-
!colspan=9 style="background:#B31021; color:#999999;"| Big Ten regular season

|-
!colspan=9 style="background:#B31021; color:#999999;"| Big Ten Women's Tournament

|-
!colspan=9 style="background:#B31021; color:#999999;"| NCAA Women's Tournament

Rankings

See also
 2015–16 Ohio State Buckeyes men's basketball team

References

Ohio State Buckeyes women's basketball seasons
Ohio State
Ohio State
Ohio State Buckeyes
Ohio State Buckeyes